The FreeX Moon is a German single-place, paraglider that was designed and produced by FreeX of Egling in the mid-2000s. It is now out of production.

Design and development
The Moon was designed as an intermediate glider. Like all FreeX wings it features internal diagonal bracing. The models are each named for their relative size.

Variants
Moon S
Small-sized model for lighter pilots. The glider model is DHV 1-2 GH certified.
Moon M
Mid-sized model for medium-weight pilots. The glider model is DHV 1-2 GH certified.
Moon L
Large-sized model for heavier pilots. The glider model is DHV 1-2 GH certified.

Specifications (Moon M)

References

Moon
Paragliders